Jacque-Louis du Toit is a South African rugby union player for the  in the Currie Cup. His regular position is hooker.

Du Toit was named in the  side for the 2022 Currie Cup Premier Division.

References

South African rugby union players
Living people
Rugby union hookers
Golden Lions players
Year of birth missing (living people)